South Park High School, Lincoln, opened in 1922 and closed in 1989, was a secondary school in Lincoln, England.

History

Grammar school
The school had originally opened in May 1922 as an all-girls grammar school (South Park High School for Girls) for the south of the city. New buildings were added in October 1938 and extensions in 1962 and between 1974 and 1977. Another girls' grammar school in the city was Christ's Hospital Girls' High School, which became Lincoln Christ's Hospital School in 1974.

Comprehensive
It became co-educational in September 1974. The school was closed on 27 July 1989 due to falling numbers.[2] South Park had been originally intended for 200 pupils, however, by the time it closed its size had reached 900.

City Technology College
The school was reopened as The Lincoln School of Science and Technology in September 1992

Notable former pupils

South Park High School for Girls

 Prof Helen Atkinson CBE FIMechE FREng (nee Bavister), Professor of Materials Processing from 2002-17 at the University of Leicester
 Jane Eaglen, soprano
 Prof Diana Green CBE, Vice-Chancellor from 1998-2007 of Sheffield Hallam University (SHU)
 Dr Rosemary Horrox, historian, Fellow and former Director of Studies in History at Fitzwilliam College, Cambridge
 Karen Lee, Labour MP for Lincoln from 2017-2019, former NHS nurse
 Dame Shan Morgan, Ambassador to Argentina from 2008–12

References

External links

Defunct grammar schools in England
Defunct schools in Lincolnshire
Educational institutions established in 1922
1922 establishments in England
Educational institutions disestablished in 1989
People educated at South Park High School, Lincoln
Schools in Lincoln, England
Secondary schools in Lincolnshire